Timothy Foster Sedgwick (born 1947) is an American Episcopal ethicist. In addition to being the Clinton S. Quin Professor of Christian Ethics at Virginia Theological Seminary, he has served since 2007 as Vice President and Associate Dean of Academic Affairs.

Sedgwick received his AB from Albion College and his MA and PhD from Vanderbilt University. Following his doctorate he taught undergraduates at Denison University, Marshall University, and Blackburn College and then for 19 years taught Christian ethics at Seabury-Western Theological Seminary.

He has served the Anglican Theological Review as book review editor, board member, and president of the board and as a member of the board of directors for the Society of Christian Ethics. In the Episcopal Church he serves on the Advisory Board for the College for Bishops and on the Anglican–Roman Catholic Theological Consultation in the USA (ARC-USA) bilateral discussion, which recently completed a six-year study on moral theology. Previously he served on the Task Force on End-of-Life Issues, the Task Force on Ethics and the New Genetics, the Committee on Sexual Exploitation, the delegation to the governing Board of the National Council of Churches in Christ, the General Board of Examining Chaplains, the Council for the Development of Ministry (where he served as vice-chairperson), the Total Ministry Task Force, and the Task Force on Lay Professionals.

Sedgwick is married to Martha W. Sedgwick and has two grown daughters.

Books published

See also
 List of Virginia Theological Seminary people

References

External links
Timothy F. Sedgwick’s faculty home page, Virginia Theological Seminary

20th-century American Episcopalians
20th-century American philosophers
21st-century American Episcopalians
21st-century American philosophers
Albion College alumni
American academic administrators
American Episcopal theologians
American ethicists
Anglican philosophers
Blackburn College (Illinois)
Christian ethicists
Denison University faculty
Living people
Marshall University faculty
Vanderbilt University alumni
1947 births
Virginia Theological Seminary faculty